Norsia is a monotypic moth genus in the family Geometridae described by Francis Walker in 1867. Its only species, Norsia vincta, described by the same author in the same year, is found in Colombia.

References

Oenochrominae
Monotypic moth genera